Paul Smith (born 1968 in Sydney) is a former Australian actor, who started his career as a child actor.  He is most known as Steve in the children's television series The Henderson Kids, before being the original Simon Kelly in the sitcom Hey Dad...!

Career 
He got his start in acting during his first year of high school when a production company was holding a film audition for children in the area.

He appeared in over 15 television shows and movies from the 1980s until the early 1990s in Australia.

Filmography
 G.P. (TV series) (1992)
 Police Rescue (TV series) (1991)
 The Private War of Lucinda Smith (TV movie) (1990)
 Mission: Impossible (TV series) (1988)
 The Henderson Kids II (TV series) (1987)
 Hey Dad..! (TV series) (1987)
 Platypus Cove (Filmed 1983, released 1986)
 The Henderson Kids (TV series) (1985)
 Crime of the Decade (TV movie) (1984)
 The Cowra Breakout (TV mini-series) (1984)
 The Fire in the Stone (1984)
 A Country Practice (TV series) (1984)
 Boy in the Bush (TV mini-series) (1984)
 Waterloo Station (TV series) (1983)
 Fighting Back (1982)

References

External links
 

1968 births
Living people
Australian male television actors
Male actors from Sydney
Australian male child actors
20th-century Australian male actors